The Gambia followed a formal policy of non-alignment throughout most of former President Dawda Jawara's tenure. It maintained close relations with the United Kingdom, Senegal, and other African countries. The July 1994 coup strained The Gambia's relationship with Western powers, particularly the United States. Starting in 1995, President Yahya Jammeh established diplomatic relations with several additional countries, including Libya, the Republic of China (on Taiwan, before 2013), and Cuba. During his last years, the EU grew increasingly intolerant of Jammeh's iron-fist rule. Consequently, Brussels withheld millions of Euros to The Gambia. Jammeh fired back by expelling the EU's top diplomat in the country after he had accused the bloc and human rights activists of conniving to besmirch the image of his government for its stance on homosexuality.

Bilateral relations

Africa

Asia

Americas

Europe

Pacific

The Gambia and the Commonwealth of Nations

The Gambia was a member of the Commonwealth of Nations from its independence in 1965 until its withdrawal in October 2013.

After presidential elections in 2016, the winning candidate Adama Barrow promised to return The Gambia to the Commonwealth. On 14 February 2017, The Gambia began the process of returning and formally presented its application to re-join to Secretary-General Patricia Scotland on 22 January 2018. Boris Johnson, who became the first British Foreign Secretary to visit The Gambia since the country gained independence in 1965, announced that the British government welcomed The Gambia's return to the Commonwealth.

See also

 List of diplomatic missions in the Gambia
 List of diplomatic missions of the Gambia

References 

 
The Gambia and the Commonwealth of Nations